The Bayer designation Lambda Sculptoris (λ Scl, λ Sculptoris) is shared by two star systems, λ1 Sculptoris and λ2 Sculptoris, in the constellation Sculptor. They are separated by 0.29° on the sky.

 λ1 Sculptoris
 λ2 Sculptoris

Sculptoris, Lambda
Sculptor (constellation)